Marianna Moór (born 5 February 1943 in Budapest) is a Hungarian actress.

Selected filmography
 Sodrásban (1964)
 Voyage with Jacob (1972)
 The Pendragon Legend (1974)
 The Fifth Seal (1976)
 Árvácska (1976)
 A ménesgazda (1978)
 Dögkeselyű (1982)
 The Unburied Man (2004)
 Adventure'' (2011)

External links

1943 births
Living people
Hungarian film actresses
Actresses from Budapest